Ten Years and Running is a compilation album by American punk rock band MxPx. Released on Tooth and Nail Records, the album consists of nineteen songs spanning MxPx's career, mostly from Tooth and Nail releases but including a song each from the A&M releases Slowly Going the Way of the Buffalo, The Ever Passing Moment, The Broken Bones, and Fat Wreck Chords' The Renaissance EP. The band self-produced a re-recording of "Punk Rawk Show" and two new songs, "My Mistake" and "Running Away," for the compilation. A music video was made for "My Mistake." Tim Palmer either mixed or remixed all of the songs except "My Life Story" and "The Broken Bones."

The album is not a greatest hits album, as it omits MxPx' more well-known singles "Responsibility" and "I'm OK, You're OK," but is considered a retrospective of the first ten years of the band.  The booklet accompanying the CD features many previously unreleased photographs of the band and a detailed timeline of moments in their career.

Track listing
 "Punk Rawk Show" - 2:26
 "My Mistake" - 2:06
 "Running Away" - 2:37
 "Chick Magnet" - 3:12
 "Want Ad" - 1:24
 "Tomorrow's Another Day" - 2:47
 "Doing Time" - 1:24
 "The Broken Bones" - 2:12
 "My Life Story" - 2:43
 "Teenage Politics" - 2:50
 "PxPx" - 1:08
 "GSF" - 2:33
 "Do Your Feet Hurt?" - 3:10
 "Let It Happen" - 2:44
 "Lonesome Town" - 2:32
 "Dolores" - 1:29
 "Rock & Roll Girl" - 2:06
 "Move to Bremerton" - 3:25
 "Middlename (Live version)" - 3:29

Personnel 
Mike Herrera - Bass, Vocals
Tom Wisniewski - Lead Guitar
Yuri Ruley - Drums
 Mixed by Tim Palmer

References

Albums produced by Jerry Finn
Albums produced by Aaron Sprinkle
MxPx compilation albums
2002 compilation albums
Tooth & Nail Records compilation albums
Albums produced by Bill Stevenson (musician)